Al Bir (ar:البير) is a village in  Saudi Arabia, and a village of Al-Mehmal area (Known nowadays as Thadig), which is one of the  populous urban areas in Riyadh region.

In urban view, Al Bir is one of the most old village in Al-Mehmal area. Furthermore, some historians believes that it was originally a source of ground water. In addition, some believes the village was part of Muslims pilgrims path  to Holly city of Makah, especially pilgrims coming from the eastern part of Arabian peninsula.

Al Bir was founded in 1015 Hijri  ( around 1606 AD) when Al- Duwasir tribe ( precisely Al- Honaihen)  moved to the area.

Al-Honaihen, namely; Mohammad and his brother Abdullah, took over Al Bir town from AlErinat, and they established their presence and their offspring.

Al bir enjoys a quiet peaceful green location, with mountains and hills surrounding it, as if protecting the town from the desert. its geographical location gathers rain water from the regions around it. after rain fall, the town blooms with greenery and flowers of different kinds.

See also 

 List of cities and towns in Saudi Arabia
 Regions of Saudi Arabia

Populated places in Riyadh Province
Populated places established in the 1600s